This is a list of the songs that reached number-one position in official Polish single chart in ZPAV in 2011.
There was a total of 19 number-one singles in 2011.

In 2011, fifteen artists gained their first number-one single in Poland either as a lead or featured act: Duck Sauce, Andrzej Piaseczny, Nelly, Ewa Farna, Bruno Mars, The Black Eyed Peas, Blue Café, Sylwia Grzeszczak, Zakopower, Adele, Maroon 5, Christina Aguilera, Olly Murs, Rizzle Kicks and Foster the People.

In 2011, Lady Gaga, Katy Perry, Adele and Sylwia Grzeszczak each scored their second number-one singles in Poland. Rihanna also scored her fourth number-one single in Poland. Sylwia Grzeszczak's "Małe rzeczy" was the longest-running number-one single of the year, with each single scoring eight consecutive weeks at the top.

Chart history

Number-one artists

See also
 List of number-one dance singles of 2011 (Poland)
 List of number-one albums of 2011 (Poland)

References

Poland
2011
No One